Konstantin Aleksandrovich Gordiyuk (born 11 March 1978) is a former Russian professional footballer.

Club career
He made his debut in the Russian Premier League in 1996 for FC Chernomorets Novorossiysk.

Honours
 Russian Second Division, Zone South best defender: 2009.

References

1978 births
People from Novorossiysk
Living people
Russian footballers
Association football defenders
FC Chernomorets Novorossiysk players
FC Kuban Krasnodar players
FC Luch Vladivostok players
FC Dynamo Barnaul players
FC Zhemchuzhina Sochi players
FC Sibir Novosibirsk players
Russian Premier League players
FC Slavyansk Slavyansk-na-Kubani players
FC Nosta Novotroitsk players
Sportspeople from Krasnodar Krai